Pope Francis: A Man of His Word is a 2018 documentary film produced, co-written and directed by Wim Wenders, focusing on the life and goals of Pope Francis, the 266th and current Pope and sovereign of the Vatican City State. A Swiss-Italian-French-German co-production, the film premiered at the 2018 Cannes Film Festival and was released in the United States on May 18, 2018.

Premise
Following Pope Francis as he tries to spread his words of peace in modern times.

During the film, Pope Francis discusses various topics as he looks directly into the camera and seems to be talking directly to the viewer. Interviewer (Wenders) is not in the frame due to the chosen genre of the interview - "alone with the world". Francis' direct speech is alternated with various documentary shots about his life (visits to prisons and hospitals, speeches, etc.).

Cast (*non-speaking appearances)

Production
Wenders said the project originated when the Vatican sent him a letter in 2014 asking him to lead a project about Pope Francis. While Wenders shot the interview sessions with Francis, as well as the re-enactments and everything around the city of Assisi, much of the rest of the film was stock footage from TV stations and the Vatican archives; he received final cut privilege on the project.

Reception

Box office
Pope Francis: A Man of His Word  grossed $2 million in the United States and Canada, and $6.5 million in other territories, for a total worldwide gross of $8.5 million.

The film began its limited release on May 18, 2018 and over its opening weekend grossed $507,870 from 346 theaters, finishing 16th at the box office.

The film was released on August 10, 2018 in the UK.

Critical response
The website's critical consensus reads: "Pope Francis - A Man of His Word offers a compelling look at the pontiff's ideas and message, even if its distance from the man means it won't win many new converts." On Metacritic, the film has a weighted average score of 63 out of 100, based on 24 critics, indicating "generally favorable reviews". Audiences polled by PostTrak gave the film a 92% overall positive score, with 82% saying they would definitely recommend it.

Nick Allen of RogerEbert.com wrote that the film is like "a non-denominational sermon, under the cinematic care of an artist first, Pope Francis fanboy second." Comparing it to previous documentaries about global warming, he also wrote that it is "a food-for-thought doc that wholly justifies its existence."

References

External links
 

Films about popes
Works about Pope Francis
2018 films
English-language French films
English-language German films
English-language Italian films
Films directed by Wim Wenders
Films scored by Laurent Petitgand
French documentary films
German documentary films
Italian documentary films
Swiss documentary films
2010s English-language films
2010s French films
2010s German films